Casinò Lugano (formerly known as Teatro Kursaal) is a casino and theatre designed by Italian architect Achille Sfondrini in 1804. It is located in the city of Lugano, Switzerland. A restaurant and café called Elementi Ristorante is located within the building.

History

Designed by the Italian architect Achille Sfondrini in 1804, Teatro Kursaal was the first games room with a café to open in Lugano. Biriba, Basset, and dice games were played in the establishment during the autumn fair. Upon the establishment of the Lugano Theatre Society in 1885, which consisted of 177 shareholders, discussions were held to modify the building for the intended purpose of theatrical and musical performances, ballroom dance and other shows. Plans were made to accommodate a café and restaurant adjacent to the main theatre.

In 1912, the theatre acquired a gambling license. The society changed its name to Società del Teatro e Casinò Kursaal di Lugano in 1922. The Kursaal continued to increase its revenue after the Great Depression.

In 1946 the Kursaal broke its own financial record, accumulating 641,777 Swiss francs (equivalent of €558,558.65 US$811,018.50 or £519,190.25 ) after staging operas, plays, concerts and films.

On 24 May 1956, Kursaal was the host venue of the very first Eurovision Song Contest.

The gambling stakes for playing were raised, from 2 Swiss Francs to 5 Swiss Francs, after a shareholders' vote in 1959.

The city of Lugano became the major shareholder in 1970 after its purchase of 184 shares. Following the ordinance of the Swiss Federal banking commission changes, fruit machines and boules were brought into the Kursaal.

The fundamental principles were amended in 1993 to allow major games to be played on the premises. This license was later upgraded, to permit the company to operate as a casino. The theatre closed shortly after the last show in April 1997 and was demolished in 2001 to make room for the extension of the Casino. Casinò Lugano opened again on 29 November 2002.

Casinò Lugano has received an extension to its permit to also manage casino games online and has conceived the Swiss4Win brand for its entry into the online Swiss market.

References

External links

 

Lugano
Music in Lugano
Music venues in Switzerland
Buildings and structures in Ticino
Culture in Lugano
Lugano

it:Teatro Kursaal (Lugano)